Grains of Sand may refer to:

 Singular elements of sand
 Grains of Sand (album), by rock band The Mission
 The Grains of Sand, American 1960s rock band
 "Grains of Sand", an episode of The Dead Zone TV series

See also
Grain of Sand, a fictional film within the 2007 film I'm Not There